Obersturmbannführer Bruno Müller or Brunon Müller-Altenau (13 September 1905 – 1 March 1960) served as an SS Lieutenant Colonel during the Nazi German invasion of Poland. In September 1939, he was put in charge of the Einsatzkommando EK 2, attached to Einsatzgruppe EG I (pl) of the Security Police. They were deployed in Poland along with the 14th Army of the Wehrmacht.

Paramilitary posts
Müller was head of the Gestapo office (Geheimstaatspolizei) in Oldenburg from 1935 until World War II. During the invasion of Poland, he served as one of four captains of the mobile killing squads (Einsatzkommandos) within Einsatzgruppe I, led by SS-Standartenführer Bruno Streckenbach. In total, eight Einsatzgruppen had been deployed in Poland. They were active until late 1940, and composed of the Gestapo, Kripo and SD functionaries involved in extermination actions including Operation Tannenberg as well as Intelligenzaktion against the Polish cultural elites. Müller was appointed commander of the Gestapo Division 4 Krakau in the new General Government district (Generalgouvernement) two months after the attack.

Sonderaktion Krakau
Müller personally conducted the operation Sonderaktion Krakau against the Polish professors in occupied Kraków. On 6 November 1939, at the Jagiellonian University (UJ) lecture room no. 56 of the Collegium Novum, he summoned all academics for a speech, where he announced their immediate arrest and internment. Among them were 105 professors and 33 lecturers from the Jagiellonian University, including its rector Tadeusz Lehr-Spławiński, 34 professors and doctors from Academy of Mining and Metallurgy (AGH), 4 from College of Commerce (Wyższe Studium Handlowe) and 4 from Lublin and Wilno universities, as well as the President of Kraków, Dr Stanisław Klimecki who was apprehended at home. All of them, 184 persons in total, were transported to prison at Montelupich, and – some three days later – to detention center in Wrocław. They were sent to Sachsenhausen concentration camp on the other side of Berlin two weeks later, and in March 1940 further to Dachau near Munich after a new 'selection'.

Following international protest involving prominent Italians including Benito Mussolini and the Vatican, surviving prisoners older than 40, were released on 8 February 1940. More academics were released later. However, over a dozen died in captivity, including Stanisław Estreicher, and several others right after their return, owing to emaciation.

Einsatzkommando 11b
Müller briefly served as the RKF chief of staff in Silesia in late 1940, replaced by SS-Obersturmbannführer Fritz Arlt in preparation for the Action Saybusch in Żywiec. Soon later, following the German attack on the Soviet Union, Müller was selected as leader of the Einsatzkommando "11b" attached to the 11th Army of the Wehrmacht. He operated along with the entire Einsatzgruppe D (consisting of 600 men) in the territory of Crimea in southern Ukraine. From there, they went to Southern Bessarabia and the Caucasus. His Einsatzgruppe D mobile killing unit (term used by Holocaust historians), of which Einsatzkommando 11b was a part, became responsible for the murder of over 90,000 people, an average of 340 to 700 victims per day. Müller's activities in the region are not as well-documented as those of some other Nazi leaders. At the beginning of August 1941 he led the unit that massacred about 155 Jews, including women and children in the city of Bender in Moldova. Müller, who was a heavy drinker, insisted that to be trusted, every one of his men first had to burn "the bridges to respectable society" by committing murder at least once. One account tells of how he modeled the killing process by shooting a two-year-old child and the child's mother, then told his officers to follow his example.

In October 1941, four months after the commencement of Operation Barbarossa, Müller was replaced as leader of Einsatzkommando "11b" by  Werner Braune, who was later named by Commander Otto Ohlendorf in his killing tally sent to Berlin. Müller served at Rouen, Prague and Kiel before the end of World War II. 

In 1947, Müller was apprehended by the Allies and put on trial as a war criminal in December 1947, for his role in the atrocities committed in Nordmark at the KZ Hassee–Kiel slave labor camp where 500 prisoners died between May 1944 and the end of the war. A British military court sentenced Müller to sentenced to 20 years in prison, but he was released in 1953 due to amnesty laws. He died of natural causes in 1960 at the age of 54, after having worked as a salesman in West Germany for the remainder of his life.

Film portrayal
Müller activities in occupied Kraków were portrayed in the award-winning film Katyń made in 2007 by Andrzej Wajda; he was played by the Berlin-based actor Joachim Paul Assböck (Assboeck).

Notes and references

1905 births
1960 deaths
People from Alsace-Lorraine
Gestapo personnel
Einsatzgruppen personnel
Military personnel from Strasbourg
SS-Obersturmbannführer
Reich Security Main Office personnel
Holocaust perpetrators in Poland
Holocaust perpetrators in Ukraine
Prisoners and detainees of the British military
Nazis convicted of war crimes